Sedki may refer to:

People

Sedki is a spelling of the name Sidqi.

Places
 Sędki, Łódź Voivodeship, Polish village
 Sędki, Warmian-Masurian Voivodeship, Polish village